Stanton Independent School District is a public school district based in Stanton, Texas, (USA).

Located in Martin County, a portion of the district extends into Howard County.

The Martin County portion includes a section of Midland.

In 2009, the school district was rated "academically acceptable" by the Texas Education Agency.

References

External links

School districts in Martin County, Texas
School districts in Howard County, Texas
School districts in Midland, Texas